Al Hasan Naqiyy (formerly Arlandis Hinton; born January 23, 1975), known professionally as B.G. Knocc Out is an American West Coast rapper and songwriter. He is best known for his collaboration on Eazy-E's 1993 single "Real Muthaphuckkin G's". He is also the younger half-brother of West Coast rapper, Dresta.

Early life 
Al Hasan Naqiyy was born in Compton, California on January 23, 1975, as Arlandis Hinton. He was raised by a single mother, Christine Thomas, and older half brother Andre Wicker. Growing up in Compton and Watts, along with its strong influence of gangs, Hinton became involved with the Nutty Blocc Compton Crip set along with his brother.

Musical career 
B.G Knocc Out first began his musical career after meeting Eazy-E through his brother. In August 1995, along with Dresta their first studio album "Real Brothas" was released through Def Jam records and Outburst records. The album had peaked #128 on the Billboard 200. He has gone on to release nine additional albums including Prince of Compton (2009), Eazy-E's Protege (2011), and Blocc Boyz (2015). On August 10, 2019, he released a single titled "Nobody Move", which featured Ricc Rocc and Michael ACE.

Personal life 
After his work on "Real Muthaphuckkin G's", B.G. Knocc Out was convicted of attempted murder and served ten years in prison. After his release he released his first solo album, Eazy-E's Protege, in 2011. He is a Muslim.

Discography

Studio albums
Eazy-E's Protege (2011)
Nutty by Nature (2015)
Blocc Boyz (2015)
Uncommon (2017)
1-Up (2017)

Collaboration albums
Real Brothas with Dresta (1995)

Compilation albums
Features (2017)

Extended plays
St. L.A. (2015)
Da New Crip (2017)
5st Regime Change (2018)

Guest appearances

References

External links

Living people
African-American male rappers
African-American Muslims
American people convicted of attempted murder
Def Jam Recordings artists
Gangsta rappers
Musicians from Compton, California
Rappers from Los Angeles
Ruthless Records artists
West Coast hip hop musicians
21st-century American rappers
21st-century American male musicians
1975 births
21st-century African-American musicians
20th-century African-American people